Robert Roy Maud, (12 August 1946 – 15 March 2006) was a South African tennis player.

Maud made his Davis Cup debut at the age of 18, and was a member of the squad that gained South Africa's only Davis Cup triumph in 1974. He was 5’11 and three quarters and He was ranked in the Top 10 in South Africa for 10 successive years, and partnered Betty Stöve to the 1971 US Open mixed doubles final against Billie Jean King and Owen Davidson (3–6, 5–7).

In July 1968 he won the singles title at the Dutch Open in Hilversum after defeating István Gulyás in the final in five sets.

Grand Slam finals

Mixed doubles

References

External links
 
 

1946 births
2006 deaths
Tennis players from Johannesburg
South African male tennis players
White South African people